() is a martial art developed in the Ryukyu Kingdom. It developed from the indigenous Ryukyuan martial arts (called , "hand"; tii in Okinawan) under the influence of Chinese martial arts, particularly Fujian White Crane. Karate is now predominantly a striking art using punching, kicking, knee strikes, elbow strikes and open-hand techniques such as knife-hands, spear-hands and palm-heel strikes. Historically, and in some modern styles, grappling, throws, joint locks, restraints and vital-point strikes are also taught.

The Empire of Japan annexed the Ryukyu Kingdom in 1879. Karate came to mainland Japan in the early 20th century during a time of migration as Ryukyuans, especially from Okinawa, looked for work in the main islands of Japan. It was systematically taught in Japan after the Taishō era of 1912–1926. In 1922, the Japanese Ministry of Education invited Gichin Funakoshi to Tokyo to give a karate demonstration. In 1924, Keio University established the first university karate club in mainland Japan, and by 1932 major Japanese universities had karate clubs. After World War II, Okinawa became (1945) an important United States military site and karate became popular among servicemen stationed there.

The martial arts movies of the 1960s and 1970s served to greatly increase the popularity of martial arts around the world, and English-speakers began to use the word karate in a generic way to refer to all striking-based Asian martial arts. Karate schools (dōjōs) began appearing around the world, catering to those with casual interest as well as those seeking a deeper study of the art.

Shigeru Egami, Chief Instructor of the Shotokan dōjō, opined that "the majority of followers of karate in overseas countries pursue karate only for its fighting techniques ... Movies and television ... depict karate as a mysterious way of fighting capable of causing death or injury with a single blow ... the mass media present a pseudo art far from the real thing." Shōshin Nagamine said: "Karate may be considered as the conflict within oneself or as a life-long marathon which can be won only through self-discipline, hard training and one's own creative efforts."

On 28 September 2015 karate featured on a shortlist (along with baseball, softball, skateboarding, surfing, and sport climbing) for consideration for inclusion in the 2020 Summer Olympics. On 1 June 2016 the International Olympic Committee's executive board announced they were supporting the inclusion of all five sports (counting baseball and softball as only one sport) for inclusion in the 2020 Games.

Web Japan (sponsored by the Japanese Ministry of Foreign Affairs) claims that karate has 50 million practitioners worldwide, while the World Karate Federation claims there are 100 million practitioners around the world.

Etymology
It was changed to a homophone meaning empty hand (空手) in 1935. The original use of the word "karate" in print is attributed to Ankō Itosu; he wrote it as "唐手". The Tang Dynasty of China ended in AD 907, but the kanji representing it remains in use in Japanese language referring to China generally, in such words as "唐人街" meaning Chinatown. Thus the word "karate" was originally a way of expressing "martial art from China."

The first documented use of a homophone of the logogram pronounced kara by replacing the Chinese character meaning "Tang Dynasty" with the character meaning "empty"  took place in Karate Kumite written in August 1905 by Chōmo Hanashiro (1869–1945). Sino-Japanese relations have never been very good and especially at the time of the Japanese invasion of Manchuria, referring to the Chinese origins of karate was considered politically incorrect.

Another nominal development is the addition of dō (道:どう) to the end of the word karate. Dō is a suffix having numerous meanings including road, path, route and way. It is used in many martial arts that survived Japan's transition from feudal culture to modern times. It implies that these arts are not just fighting systems but contain spiritual elements when promoted as disciplines. In this context dō is usually translated as "the way of ___". Examples include aikido, judo, kyūdō and kendo. Thus karatedō is more than just empty hand techniques. It is "The Way of the Empty Hand".

History

Okinawa

Karate began as a common fighting system known as te (Okinawan: ti) among the Pechin class of the Ryukyuans. After trade relationships were established with the Ming dynasty of China in 1372 by King Satto of Chūzan, some forms of Chinese martial arts were introduced to the Ryukyu Islands by the visitors from China, particularly Fujian Province. A large group of Chinese families moved to Okinawa around 1392 for the purpose of cultural exchange, where they established the community of Kumemura and shared their knowledge of a wide variety of Chinese arts and sciences, including the Chinese martial arts. The political centralization of Okinawa by King Shō Hashi in 1429 and the policy of banning weapons by King Shō Shin in 1477, later enforced in Okinawa after the invasion by the Shimazu clan in 1609, are also factors that furthered the development of unarmed combat techniques in Okinawa.

There were few formal styles of te, but rather many practitioners with their own methods. One surviving example is the Motobu-ryū school passed down from the Motobu family by Seikichi Uehara. Early styles of karate are often generalized as Shuri-te, Naha-te, and Tomari-te, named after the three cities from which they emerged. Each area and its teachers had particular kata, techniques, and principles that distinguished their local version of te from the others.

Members of the Okinawan upper classes were sent to China regularly to study various political and practical disciplines. The incorporation of empty-handed Chinese Kung Fu into Okinawan martial arts occurred partly because of these exchanges and partly because of growing legal restrictions on the use of weaponry. Traditional karate kata bear a strong resemblance to the forms found in Fujian martial arts such as Fujian White Crane, Five Ancestors, and Gangrou-quan (Hard Soft Fist; pronounced "Gōjūken" in Japanese). Many Okinawan weapons such as the sai, tonfa, and nunchaku may have originated in and around Southeast Asia.

Sakukawa Kanga (1786–1867) had studied pugilism and staff (bo) fighting in China (according to one legend, under the guidance of Kosokun, originator of kusanku kata). In 1806, he started teaching a fighting art in the city of Shuri that he called "Tudi Sakukawa," which meant "Sakukawa of China Hand." This was the first known recorded reference to the art of "Tudi," written as 唐手. Around the 1820s Sakukawa's most significant student Matsumura Sōkon (1809–1899) taught a synthesis of te (Shuri-te and Tomari-te) and Shaolin (Chinese 少林) styles. Matsumura's style would later become the Shōrin-ryū style.

Matsumura taught his art to Itosu Ankō (1831–1915) among others. Itosu adapted two forms he had learned from Matsumura. These are kusanku and chiang nan. He created the ping'an forms ("heian" or "pinan" in Japanese) which are simplified kata for beginning students. In 1901, Itosu helped to get karate introduced into Okinawa's public schools. These forms were taught to children at the elementary school level. Itosu's influence in karate is broad. The forms he created are common across nearly all styles of karate. His students became some of the most well-known karate masters, including Gichin Funakoshi, Kenwa Mabuni, and Chōki Motobu. Itosu is sometimes referred to as "the Grandfather of Modern Karate."

In 1881, Higaonna Kanryō returned from China after years of instruction with Ryu Ryu Ko and founded what would become Naha-te. One of his students was the founder of Gojū-ryū, Chōjun Miyagi. Chōjun Miyagi taught such well-known karateka as Seko Higa (who also trained with Higaonna), Meitoku Yagi, Miyazato Ei'ichi, and Seikichi Toguchi, and for a very brief time near the end of his life, An'ichi Miyagi (a teacher claimed by Morio Higaonna).

In addition to the three early te styles of karate a fourth Okinawan influence is that of Uechi Kanbun (1877–1948). At the age of 20 he went to Fuzhou in Fujian Province, China, to escape Japanese military conscription. While there he studied under Shū Shiwa (Chinese: Zhou Zihe  1874–1926). He was a leading figure of Chinese Nanpa Shorin-ken style at that time. He later developed his own style of Uechi-ryū karate based on the Sanchin, Seisan, and Sanseiryu kata that he had studied in China.

Japan

Gichin Funakoshi, the founder of Shotokan karate, is generally credited with having introduced and popularized karate on the main islands of Japan. In addition, many Okinawans were actively teaching, and are thus also responsible for the development of karate on the main islands. Funakoshi was a student of both Asato Ankō and Itosu Ankō (who had worked to introduce karate to the Okinawa Prefectural School System in 1902). During this time period, prominent teachers who also influenced the spread of karate in Japan included Kenwa Mabuni, Chōjun Miyagi, Chōki Motobu, Kanken Tōyama, and Kanbun Uechi. This was a turbulent period in the history of the region. It includes Japan's annexation of the Okinawan island group in 1872, the First Sino-Japanese War (1894–1895), the Russo-Japanese War (1904–1905), the annexation of Korea, and the rise of Japanese militarism (1905–1945).

Japan was invading China at the time, and Funakoshi knew that the art of Tang/China hand would not be accepted; thus the change of the art's name to "way of the empty hand." The dō suffix implies that karatedō is a path to self-knowledge, not just a study of the technical aspects of fighting. Like most martial arts practised in Japan, karate made its transition from -jutsu to -dō around the beginning of the 20th century. The "dō" in "karate-dō" sets it apart from karate-jutsu, as aikido is distinguished from aikijutsu, judo from jujutsu, kendo from kenjutsu and iaido from iaijutsu.

Funakoshi changed the names of many kata and the name of the art itself (at least on mainland Japan), doing so to get karate accepted by the Japanese budō organization Dai Nippon Butoku Kai. Funakoshi also gave Japanese names to many of the kata. The five pinan forms became known as heian, the three naihanchi forms became known as tekki, seisan as hangetsu, Chintō as gankaku, wanshu as enpi, and so on. These were mostly political changes, rather than changes to the content of the forms, although Funakoshi did introduce some such changes. Funakoshi had trained in two of the popular branches of Okinawan karate of the time, Shorin-ryū and Shōrei-ryū. In Japan he was influenced by kendo, incorporating some ideas about distancing and timing into his style. He always referred to what he taught as simply karate, but in 1936 he built a dōjō in Tokyo and the style he left behind is usually called Shotokan after this dōjō. Shoto, meaning "pine wave", was Funakoshi's pen name and kan meaning "hall".

The modernization and systemization of karate in Japan also included the adoption of the white uniform that consisted of the kimono and the dogi or keikogi—mostly called just karategi—and coloured belt ranks. Both of these innovations were originated and popularized by Jigoro Kano, the founder of judo and one of the men Funakoshi consulted in his efforts to modernize karate.

A new form of karate called Kyokushin was formally founded in 1957 by Masutatsu Oyama (who was born a Korean, Choi Yeong-Eui 최영의). Kyokushin is largely a synthesis of Shotokan and Gōjū-ryū. It teaches a curriculum that emphasizes aliveness, physical toughness, and full contact sparring. Because of its emphasis on physical, full-force sparring, Kyokushin is now often called "full contact karate", or "Knockdown karate" (after the name for its competition rules). Many other karate organizations and styles are descended from the Kyokushin curriculum.

Practice

Karate can be practiced as an art (budō), self defense or as a combat sport. Traditional karate places emphasis on self-development (budō). Modern Japanese style training emphasizes the psychological elements incorporated into a proper kokoro (attitude) such as perseverance, fearlessness, virtue, and leadership skills. Sport karate places emphasis on exercise and competition. Weapons are an important training activity in some styles of karate.

Karate training is commonly divided into kihon (basics or fundamentals), kata (forms), and kumite (sparring).

Kihon

Kihon means basics and these form the base for everything else in the style including stances, strikes, punches, kicks and blocks. Karate styles place varying importance on kihon. Typically this is training in unison of a technique or a combination of techniques by a group of karateka. Kihon may also be prearranged drills in smaller groups or in pairs.

Kata

Kata (型:かた) means literally "shape" or "model." Kata is a formalized sequence of movements which represent various offensive and defensive postures. These postures are based on idealized combat applications. The applications when applied in a demonstration with real opponents is referred to as a Bunkai. The Bunkai shows how every stance and movement is used. Bunkai is a useful tool to understand a kata.

To attain a formal rank the karateka must demonstrate competent performance of specific required kata for that level. The Japanese terminology for grades or ranks is commonly used. Requirements for examinations vary among schools.

Kumite

Sparring in Karate is called kumite (組手:くみて). It literally means "meeting of hands." Kumite is practiced both as a sport and as self-defense training.

Levels of physical contact during sparring vary considerably. Full contact karate has several variants. Knockdown karate (such as Kyokushin) uses full power techniques to bring an opponent to the ground. Sparring in armour, bogu kumite, allows full power techniques with some safety. Sport kumite in many international competition under the World Karate Federation is free or structured with light contact or semi contact and points are awarded by a referee.

In structured kumite (yakusoku, prearranged), two participants perform a choreographed series of techniques with one striking while the other blocks. The form ends with one devastating technique (hito tsuki).

In free sparring (Jiyu Kumite), the two participants have a free choice of scoring techniques. The allowed techniques and contact level are primarily determined by sport or style organization policy, but might be modified according to the age, rank and sex of the participants. Depending upon style, take-downs, sweeps and in some rare cases even time-limited grappling on the ground are also allowed.

Free sparring is performed in a marked or closed area. The bout runs for a fixed time (2 to 3 minutes.) The time can run continuously (iri kume) or be stopped for referee judgment. In light contact or semi contact kumite, points are awarded based on the criteria: good form, sporting attitude, vigorous application, awareness/zanshin, good timing and correct distance.
In full contact karate kumite, points are based on the results of the impact, rather than the formal appearance of the scoring technique.

Dōjō Kun

In the bushidō tradition dōjō kun is a set of guidelines for karateka to follow. These guidelines apply both in the dōjō (training hall) and in everyday life.

Conditioning
Okinawan karate uses supplementary training known as hojo undo. This utilizes simple equipment made of wood and stone. The makiwara is a striking post. The nigiri game is a large jar used for developing grip strength. These supplementary exercises are designed to increase strength, stamina, speed, and muscle coordination. Sport Karate emphasizes aerobic exercise, anaerobic exercise, power, agility, flexibility, and stress management. All practices vary depending upon the school and the teacher.

Sport
 said, "There are no contests in karate." In pre–World War II Okinawa, kumite was not part of karate training. Shigeru Egami relates that, in 1940, some karateka were ousted from their dōjō because they adopted sparring after having learned it in Tokyo.

Karate is divided into style organizations. These organizations sometimes cooperate in non-style specific sport karate organizations or federations. Examples of sport organizations include AAKF/ITKF, AOK, TKL, AKA, WKF, NWUKO, WUKF and WKC. Organizations hold competitions (tournaments) from local to international level. Tournaments are designed to match members of opposing schools or styles against one another in kata, sparring and weapons demonstration. They are often separated by age, rank and sex with potentially different rules or standards based on these factors. The tournament may be exclusively for members of a particular style (closed) or one in which any martial artist from any style may participate within the rules of the tournament (open).

The World Karate Federation (WKF) is the largest sport karate organization and is recognized by the International Olympic Committee (IOC) as being responsible for karate competition in the Olympic Games. The WKF has developed common rules governing all styles. The national WKF organizations coordinate with their respective National Olympic Committees.

WKF karate competition has two disciplines: sparring (kumite) and forms (kata). Competitors may enter either as individuals or as part of a team. Evaluation for kata and kobudō is performed by a panel of judges, whereas sparring is judged by a head referee, usually with assistant referees at the side of the sparring area. Sparring matches are typically divided by weight, age, gender, and experience.

WKF only allows membership through one national organization/federation per country to which clubs may join. The World Union of Karate-do Federations (WUKF) offers different styles and federations a world body they may join, without having to compromise their style or size. The WUKF accepts more than one federation or association per country.

Sport organizations use different competition rule systems. Light contact rules are used by the WKF, WUKO, IASK and WKC. Full contact karate rules used by Kyokushinkai, Seidokaikan and other organizations. Bogu kumite (full contact with protective shielding of targets) rules are used in the World Koshiki Karate-Do Federation organization. Shinkaratedo Federation use boxing gloves. Within the United States, rules may be under the jurisdiction of state sports authorities, such as the boxing commission.

In August 2016, the International Olympic Committee approved karate as an Olympic sport beginning at the 2020 Summer Olympics.

Karate, although not widely used in mixed martial arts, has been effective for some MMA practitioners.
Various styles of karate are practiced in MMA: Lyoto Machida and John Makdessi practice Shotokan; Bas Rutten and Georges St-Pierre train in Kyokushin;  Michelle Waterson holds a black belt in American Free Style Karate; Stephen Thompson practices American Kenpo Karate; and Robert Whittaker practices Gōjū-ryū.

Rank

In 1924, Gichin Funakoshi, founder of Shotokan Karate, adopted the Dan system from the judo founder Jigoro Kano using a rank scheme with a limited set of belt colors. Other Okinawan teachers also adopted this practice. In the Kyū/Dan system the beginner grades start with a higher numbered kyū (e.g., 10th Kyū or Jukyū) and progress toward a lower numbered kyū. The Dan progression continues from 1st Dan (Shodan, or 'beginning dan') to the higher dan grades. Kyū-grade karateka are referred to as "color belt" or mudansha ("ones without dan/rank"). Dan-grade karateka are referred to as yudansha (holders of dan/rank). Yudansha typically wear a black belt. Normally, the first five to six dans are given by examination by superior dan holders, while the subsequent (7 and up) are honorary, given for special merits and/or age reached.
Requirements of rank differ among styles, organizations, and schools. Kyū ranks stress stance, balance, and coordination. Speed and power are added at higher grades.

Minimum age and time in rank are factors affecting promotion. Testing consists of demonstration of techniques before a panel of examiners. This will vary by school, but testing may include everything learned at that point, or just new information. The demonstration is an application for new rank (shinsa) and may include kata, bunkai, self-defense, routines, tameshiwari (breaking), and kumite (sparring).

Philosophy
In Karate-Do Kyohan, Funakoshi quoted from the Heart Sutra, which is prominent in Shingon Buddhism: "Form is emptiness, emptiness is form itself" (shiki zokuze kū kū zokuze shiki).
He interpreted the "kara" of Karate-dō to mean "to purge oneself of selfish and evil thoughts ... for only with a clear mind and conscience can the practitioner understand the knowledge which he receives."  Funakoshi believed that one should be "inwardly humble and outwardly gentle." Only by behaving humbly can one be open to Karate's many lessons. This is done by listening and being receptive to criticism. He considered courtesy of prime importance. He said that "Karate is properly applied only in those rare situations in which one really must either down another or be downed by him." Funakoshi did not consider it unusual for a devotee to use Karate in a real physical confrontation no more than perhaps once in a lifetime. He stated that Karate practitioners must "never be easily drawn into a fight." It is understood that one blow from a real expert could mean death. It is clear that those who misuse what they have learned bring dishonor upon themselves. He promoted the character trait of personal conviction. In "time of grave public crisis, one must have the courage ... to face a million and one opponents."  He taught that indecisiveness is a weakness.

Styles

Karate is divided into many styles, each with their different training methods, focuses, and cultures; though they mainly originate from the historical Okinawan parent styles of Naha-te, Tomari-te and Shuri-te. In the modern era the major four styles of karate are considered to be Gōjū-ryū, Shotokan, Shitō-ryū, and Wadō-ryū. These four styles are those recognised by the World Karate Federation for international kata competition.

Other internationally recognised styles include but are not limited to:

Chitō-ryū
Gosoku-ryu
Isshin-ryū
Kyokushin
Motobu-ryu
Shōrin-ryū
Shūkōkai
Uechi-Ryū

World

Africa
Karate has grown in popularity in Africa, particularly in South Africa and Ghana.

Americas

Canada
Karate began in Canada in the 1930s and 1940s as Japanese people immigrated to the country. Karate was practised quietly without a large amount of organization. During the Second World War, many Japanese-Canadian families were moved to the interior of British Columbia. Masaru Shintani, at the age of 13, began to study Shorin-Ryu karate in the Japanese camp under Kitigawa. In 1956, after 9 years of training with Kitigawa, Shintani travelled to Japan and met Hironori Otsuka (Wado Ryu). In 1958, Otsuka invited Shintani to join his organization Wado Kai, and in 1969 he asked Shintani to officially call his style Wado.

In Canada during this same time, karate was also introduced by Masami Tsuruoka who had studied in Japan in the 1940s under Tsuyoshi Chitose. In 1954, Tsuruoka initiated the first karate competition in Canada and laid the foundation for the National Karate Association.

In the late 1950s Shintani moved to Ontario and began teaching karate and judo at the Japanese Cultural Centre in Hamilton. In 1966, he began (with Otsuka's endorsement) the Shintani Wado Kai Karate Federation. During the 1970s Otsuka appointed Shintani the Supreme Instructor of Wado Kai in North America. In 1979, Otsuka publicly promoted Shintani to hachidan (8th dan) and privately gave him a kudan certificate (9th dan), which was revealed by Shintani in 1995. Shintani and Otsuka visited each other in Japan and Canada several times, the last time in 1980 two years prior to Otsuka's death. Shintani died 7 May 2000.

United States

After World War II, members of the United States military learned karate in Okinawa or Japan and then opened schools in the US. In 1945, Robert Trias opened the first dōjō in the United States in Phoenix, Arizona, a Shuri-ryū karate dōjō. In the 1950s, William J. Dometrich, Ed Parker, Cecil T. Patterson, Gordon Doversola, Donald Hugh Nagle, George Mattson and Peter Urban all began instructing in the US.

Tsutomu Ohshima began studying karate under Shotokan's founder, Gichin Funakoshi, while a student at Waseda University, beginning in 1948. In 1957, Ohshima received his godan (fifth-degree black belt), the highest rank awarded by Funakoshi. He founded the first university karate club in the United States at California Institute of Technology in 1957. In 1959, he founded the Southern California Karate Association (SCKA) which was renamed Shotokan Karate of America (SKA) in 1969.

In the 1960s, Anthony Mirakian, Richard Kim, Teruyuki Okazaki, John Pachivas, Allen Steen, Gosei Yamaguchi (son of Gōgen Yamaguchi), Michael G. Foster and Pat Burleson began teaching martial arts around the country.

In 1961, Hidetaka Nishiyama, a co-founder of the Japan Karate Association (JKA) and student of Gichin Funakoshi, began teaching in the United States. He founded the International Traditional Karate Federation (ITKF). Takayuki Mikami was sent to New Orleans by the JKA in 1963.

In 1964, Takayuki Kubota relocated the International Karate Association from Tokyo to California.

Asia

Korea

Due to past conflict between Korea and Japan, most notably during the Japanese occupation of Korea in the early 20th century, the influence of karate in Korea is a contentious issue. From 1910 until 1945, Korea was annexed by the Japanese Empire. It was during this time that many of the Korean martial arts masters of the 20th century were exposed to Japanese karate. After regaining independence from Japan, many Korean martial arts schools that opened up in the 1940s and 1950s were founded by masters who had trained in karate in Japan as part of their martial arts training.

Won Kuk Lee, a Korean student of Funakoshi, founded the first martial arts school after the Japanese occupation of Korea ended in 1945, called the Chung Do Kwan. Having studied under Gichin Funakoshi at Chuo University, Lee had incorporated taekkyon, kung fu, and karate in the martial art that he taught which he called "Tang Soo Do", the Korean transliteration of the Chinese characters for "Way of Chinese Hand" (唐手道). In the mid-1950s, the martial arts schools were unified under President Rhee Syngman's order, and became taekwondo under the leadership of Choi Hong Hi and a committee of Korean masters. Choi, a significant figure in taekwondo history, had also studied karate under Funakoshi. Karate also provided an important comparative model for the early founders of taekwondo in the formalization of their art including hyung and the belt ranking system. The original taekwondo hyung were identical to karate kata. Eventually, original Korean forms were developed by individual schools and associations. Although the World Taekwondo Federation and International Taekwon-Do Federation are the most prominent among Korean martial arts organizations, tang soo do schools that teach Japanese karate still exist as they were originally conveyed to Won Kuk Lee and his contemporaries from Funakoshi.

Soviet Union
Karate appeared in the Soviet Union in the mid-1960s, during Nikita Khrushchev's policy of improved international relations. The first Shotokan clubs were opened in Moscow's universities. In 1973, however, the government banned karate—together with all other foreign martial arts—endorsing only the Soviet martial art of sambo. Failing to suppress these uncontrolled groups, the USSR's Sport Committee formed the Karate Federation of USSR in December 1978. On 17 May 1984, the Soviet Karate Federation was disbanded and all karate became illegal again. In 1989, karate practice became legal again, but under strict government regulations, only after the dissolution of the Soviet Union in 1991 did independent karate schools resume functioning, and so federations were formed and national tournaments in authentic styles began.

Europe

In the 1950s and 1960s, several Japanese karate masters began to teach the art in Europe, but it was not until 1965 that the Japan Karate Association (JKA) sent to Europe four well-trained young Karate instructors Taiji Kase, Keinosuke Enoeda, Hirokazu Kanazawa and Hiroshi Shirai. Kase went to France, Enoeada to England and Shirai in Italy. These Masters maintained always a strong link between them, the JKA and the others JKA masters in the world, especially Hidetaka Nishiyama in the US

France
France Shotokan Karate was created in 1964 by Tsutomu Ohshima. It is affiliated with another of his organizations, Shotokan Karate of America (SKA). However, in 1965 Taiji Kase came from Japan along with Enoeda and Shirai, who went to England and Italy respectively, and karate came under the influence of the JKA.

Italy
Hiroshi Shirai, one of the original instructors sent by the JKA to Europe along with Kase, Enoeda and Kanazawa, moved to Italy in 1965 and quickly established a Shotokan enclave that spawned several instructors who in their turn soon spread the style all over the country. By 1970 Shotokan karate was the most spread martial art in Italy apart from Judo. Other styles such as Wado Ryu, Goju Ryu and Shito Ryu, are present and well established in Italy, while Shotokan remains the most popular.

United Kingdom

Vernon Bell, a 3rd Dan Judo instructor who had been instructed by Kenshiro Abbe introduced Karate to England in 1956, having attended classes in Henry Plée's Yoseikan dōjō in Paris. Yoseikan had been founded by Minoru Mochizuki, a master of multiple Japanese martial arts, who had studied Karate with Gichin Funakoshi, thus the Yoseikan style was heavily influenced by Shotokan. Bell began teaching in the tennis courts of his parents' back garden in Ilford, Essex and his group was to become the British Karate Federation. On 19 July 1957, Vietnamese Hoang Nam 3rd Dan, billed as "Karate champion of Indo China", was invited to teach by Bell at Maybush Road, but the first instructor from Japan was Tetsuji Murakami (1927–1987) a 3rd Dan Yoseikan under Minoru Mochizuki and 1st Dan of the JKA, who arrived in England in July 1959. In 1959, Frederick Gille set up the Liverpool branch of the British Karate Federation, which was officially recognised in 1961. The Liverpool branch was based at Harold House Jewish Boys Club in Chatham Street before relocating to the YMCA in Everton where it became known as the Red Triangle. One of the early members of this branch was Andy Sherry who had previously studied Jujutsu with Jack Britten. In 1961, Edward Ainsworth, another blackbelt Judoka, set up the first Karate study group in Ayrshire, Scotland having attended Bell's third 'Karate Summer School' in 1961.

Outside of Bell's organisation, Charles Mack traveled to Japan and studied under Masatoshi Nakayama of the Japan Karate Association who graded Mack to 1st Dan Shotokan on 4 March 1962 in Japan. Shotokai Karate was introduced to England in 1963 by another of Gichin Funakoshi's students, Mitsusuke Harada. Outside of the Shotokan stable of karate styles, Wado Ryu Karate was also an early adopted style in the UK, introduced by Tatsuo Suzuki, a 6th Dan at the time in 1964.

Despite the early adoption of Shotokan in the UK, it was not until 1964 that JKA Shotokan officially came to the UK. Bell had been corresponding with the JKA in Tokyo asking for his grades to be ratified in Shotokan having apparently learnt that Murakami was not a designated representative of the JKA. The JKA obliged, and without enforcing a grading on Bell, ratified his black belt on 5 February 1964, though he had to relinquish his Yoseikan grade. Bell requested a visitation from JKA instructors and the next year Taiji Kase, Hirokazu Kanazawa, Keinosuke Enoeda and Hiroshi Shirai gave the first JKA demo at the old Kensington Town Hall on 21 April 1965. Hirokazu Kanazawa and Keinosuke Enoeda stayed and Murakami left (later re-emerging as a 5th Dan Shotokai under Harada).

In 1966, members of the former British Karate Federation established the Karate Union of Great Britain (KUGB) under Hirokazu Kanazawa as chief instructor and affiliated to JKA. Keinosuke Enoeda came to England at the same time as Kanazawa, teaching at a dōjō in Liverpool. Kanazawa left the UK after 3 years and Enoeda took over. After Enoeda's death in 2003, the KUGB elected Andy Sherry as Chief Instructor. Shortly after this, a new association split off from KUGB, JKA England.
An earlier significant split from the KUGB took place in 1991 when a group led by KUGB senior instructor Steve Cattle formed the English Shotokan Academy (ESA). The aim of this group was to follow the teachings of Taiji Kase, formerly the JKA chief instructor in Europe, who along with Hiroshi Shirai created the World Shotokan Karate-do Academy (WKSA), in 1989 in order to pursue the teaching of "Budo" karate as opposed to what he viewed as "sport karate". Kase sought to return the practice of Shotokan Karate to its martial roots, reintroducing amongst other things open hand and throwing techniques that had been side lined as the result of competition rules introduced by the JKA. Both the ESA and the WKSA (renamed the Kase-Ha Shotokan-Ryu Karate-do Academy (KSKA) after Kase's death in 2004) continue following this path today.
In 1975, Great Britain became the first team ever to take the World male team title from Japan after being defeated the previous year in the final.

In film and popular culture
Karate spread rapidly in the West through popular culture. In 1950s popular fiction, karate was at times described to readers in near-mythical terms, and it was credible to show Western experts of unarmed combat as unaware of Eastern martial arts of this kind. Following the inclusion of judo at the 1964 Tokyo Olympics, there was growing mainstream Western interest in Japanese martial arts, particularly karate, during the 1960s. By the 1970s, martial arts films (especially kung fu films and Bruce Lee flicks from Hong Kong) had formed a mainstream genre and launched the "kung fu craze" which propelled karate and other Asian martial arts into mass popularity. However, mainstream Western audiences at the time generally did not distinguish between different Asian martial arts such as karate, kung fu and tae kwon do.

The Karate Kid (1984) and its sequels The Karate Kid, Part II (1986), The Karate Kid, Part III (1989) and The Next Karate Kid (1994) are films relating the fictional story of an American adolescent's introduction into karate. Its television sequel, Cobra Kai (2018), has led to similar growing interest in karate. The success of The Karate Kid further popularized karate (as opposed to Asian martial arts more generally) in mainstream American popular culture. Karate Kommandos is an animated children's show, with Chuck Norris appearing to reveal the moral lessons contained in every episode.

Many other film stars such as Bruce Lee, Chuck Norris, Jackie Chan, Sammo Hung, and Jet Li come from a range of other martial arts.

See also

Comparison of karate styles
Japanese martial arts
Karate World Championships
Karate at the Summer Olympics
Karate at the World Games

References

External links

 World Karate Federation

 
Japanese martial arts
History of Okinawa Prefecture
Mixed martial arts styles
Summer Olympic sports